The King and the People is a 2013 documentary film by Simon Bright, a Zimbabwean filmmaker. It follows problems of Swaziland, a landlocked country in southern Africa.

The film features Mswati III, the king of Swaziland, and his heiress and self claimed rapper Princess Sikhanyiso.

References

2013 films
Documentary films about royalty
2013 documentary films
American documentary films
Films set in Eswatini
2010s American films